The Rebuilding of London Act 1670 is an Act of the Parliament of England (22 Cha II c. 11) with the long title "Act for the rebuilding of the City of London, uniting of Parishes and rebuilding of the Cathedral and Parochial Churches within the said City."

In 1666, a similar act had been passed in order to rebuild the City of London following the Great Fire. This particular Act extended the powers to enlarge streets and also ordered the rebuilding of St Paul's Cathedral.

Wren and St. Paul's Cathedral

Fifty-one parish churches were rebuilt under the general direction of Christopher Wren (knighted in 1673). Today there are 23 left fairly intact, and ruins or only towers of a further six.  Often the new church had the same outline as the pre-Fire building, or the tower was retained. Some of the designs may be by Robert Hooke (St Martin Ludgate), but it is clear that Wren only had a general overall control of all these projects.

Wren was principally concerned with St Paul's Cathedral. The first foundations, at the east end, were dug in 1675. The ruins of the west portico of Inigo Jones, in its day a noted piece of architecture, were regretfully removed by Wren in 1688. The choir was finished for a celebratory service in 1697 (Queen Elizabeth came to another to mark its 400th anniversary in 1997); the dome was completed in 1708, and the cathedral declared finished in 1711.

Whether it is around the cathedral, during repairs to a Wren church or on some building sites, archaeological excavation in the City often finds evidence of the Fire and of the rebuilding, especially along the waterfront where the fire rubble was left in the streets and alleys to heighten the ground level against the Thames. This means that not only are some of the pre-Fire buildings saved for excavation, with walls up to five feet high, but the post-Fire improvements can be seen: wider alleys, and more construction in brick. Carved stones from destroyed churches were reused as rubble in foundations and walls, most notably in the crypt of the new St Paul's.

References

Acts of the Parliament of England
1670 in law
1670s in London
1670 in England
History of the City of London
Great Fire of London
Law in London